Adam Andretti (born March 24, 1979) is an American racing driver. He has raced in sports cars, Indy Pro Series, NASCAR, and Stadium Super Trucks. He has been competing in the Trans-Am Series since 2014.

Family background
He is the younger brother of the late veteran NASCAR racer John Andretti, nephew of Indianapolis 500 winner Mario Andretti and first cousin to IndyCar champion Michael Andretti and Jeff Andretti.  He is the first cousin once-removed to IndyCar driver Marco Andretti.  His late father Aldo Andretti, Mario's twin brother, retired from driving race cars after nearly dying in an accident. Adam married Tabitha Eve on November 3, 2007. As of 2017, they reside in Brownsburg, Indiana. Andretti is a graduate of the Skip Barber Racing School.

Racing career

Andretti's racing career started in 1994 at the age of 15 with the help of his brother John, who helped Adam obtain a ride in the new half-scale Mini Cup Stock Car series, driving for Terry Lingner of Lingner Group Productions at the Velodrome in Indianapolis. He showed promise by winning four races in 1995 and finishing fourth in the series championship. After his stint in the Mini Stocks, Andretti raced karts. His brother Mark bought him a 125cc shifter kart and they raced for the next two years in the SKUSA series. In 1998, he finished second at the Formula C World Karting Championship held in Charlotte, North Carolina. He also ran in the 24 Hours of Daytona, an event sponsored by the Grand American Road Racing Association.

In 2000, Andretti drove the No. 12 car in the short-lived United States Formula 3 Championship for Duesenberg Brothers Racing. He won a race and finished third in the series points championship. Then in 2001 and 2002, he drove in NASCAR's Featherlite Southwest Series. In 2003, Andretti drove a Corvette at Sebring Raceway in the SPEED World Challenge Series. He drove in the 2004 Rolex 24 Hours of Daytona.

Andretti made his Indy Pro Series debut at Chicagoland Speedway on September 9, 2007. His race ended with an altercation with IndyCar veteran Jimmy Kite.  Andretti announced after the race that he would compete in a full Indy Pro Series season in 2008.  On December 17 he announced that he had signed a deal with the new FuZion Autosport team for the upcoming season. However, the team and Andretti failed to participate in any league-sponsored test sessions or enter any races.

In 2014, he became the first member of the Andretti family to compete in the Trans Am Series, doing so regularly in the TA2 class. He has raced a Camaro, a Mustang, and a Challenger, picking up 6 wins and finishing second in points twice.

In December 2017, Andretti joined UFD Racing for his Stadium Super Trucks debut at the Lake Elsinore Diamond in the No. 44 truck. He failed to qualify for the first feature race after finishing sixth in his heat race, and finished twelfth in the second feature after suffering a mechanical failure on lap eight.

Andretti returned to SST in August 2018 at Road America, where he finished eleventh and ninth in the weekend's two rounds.

He has also served as a racing instructor for Road & Track magazine and some driving schools, including the Richard Petty Driving Experience.

Motorsports career results

NASCAR
(key) (Bold – Pole position awarded by qualifying time. Italics – Pole position earned by points standings or practice time. * – Most laps led.)

K&N Pro Series East

Pinty's Series

Stadium Super Trucks
(key) (Bold – Pole position. Italics – Fastest qualifier. * – Most laps led.)

References

External links
 
 Adam Andretti interview and racing background

Living people
1979 births
People from Brownsburg, Indiana
Racing drivers from Indiana
24 Hours of Daytona drivers
Indy Lights drivers
United States Formula Three Championship drivers
Rolex Sports Car Series drivers
Trans-Am Series drivers
American Speed Association drivers
NASCAR drivers
Stadium Super Trucks drivers
Adam
American people of Italian descent